The men's long jump at the 2010 European Athletics Championships was held at the Estadi Olímpic Lluís Companys on 30 July and 1 August.

Medalists

Records

Schedule

Results

Qualification
Qualification: Qualification Performance 8.00 (Q) or at least 12 best performers advance to the final

Final

References
 Qualification Results
 Final Results
Full results

Long jump
Long jump at the European Athletics Championships